C'mon, Let's Live a Little is a 1967 film directed by David Butler. It stars Bobby Vee and Jackie DeShannon.

This was the last film directed by Butler, who began acting on screen in 1917 and had been directing since the late 1920s.

Plot
Enrolling in an Arkansas college, singer Jesse Crawford saves the life of Judy Grant, a dean's daughter. She is grateful until Jesse performs at a rally staged by a student looking to discredit the dean, but Jesse was unaware of the rally's purpose and all is forgiven.

Cast
Bobby Vee as Jesse Crawford
Jackie DeShannon as Judy Grant
Eddie Hodges as Eddie Stewart
Suzie Kaye as Bee Bee Vendemeer
Patsy Kelly as Mrs Fitts
Kim Carnes as Melinda
Frank Alesia as Balta
Ken Osmond as The Beard

See also
List of American films of 1967

References

External links

C'mon Let's Live a Little at Brian's Drive-in Theatre

1967 films
Films directed by David Butler
Paramount Pictures films
1967 musical comedy films
American musical comedy films
Beach party films
1960s English-language films
1960s American films